Ronald O. Loveridge is the former mayor of Riverside, California, United States. He resides in Riverside with his wife Marsha and has two adult children. He received his undergraduate degree from the University of the Pacific and his doctorate from Stanford and currently is an associate professor of Political Science at the University of California, Riverside. His research focuses on urban politics and public policy, particularly environmental policy.

Political career
He was elected to the Riverside City council in 1979, and served in that role until 1993. He was elected as the Mayor of Riverside in 1993, and was re-elected in 1997, 2001, 2005, and 2009. After a 30 year career in elected public service, Mayor Loveridge decided not to run for a 6th term and stepped down in 2012. He was succeeded by William "Rusty" Bailey.

Loveridge served as president of the National League of Cities in 2010.

Loveridge has presented his stance on environmental issues in a public document titled "The Mayor’s Call to Action for a Sustainable Riverside."

See also

List of mayors of Riverside, California

References

External links
Ronald O. Loveridge, Director, UCR Center for Sustainable Suburban Development, University of California, Riverside
Oral History Interview with The Honorable Mayor Ronald Loveridge, August 5, 1998, University of California, Riverside

Mayors of Riverside, California
University of California, Riverside faculty
Living people
Stanford University alumni
Year of birth missing (living people)